Mahur taluka is a taluka in Nanded district of Maharashtra an Indian state.

Nanded district
There were 16 talukas in Nanded district as in November 2014, viz. Nanded, Ardhapur, Bhokar, Biloli, Deglur, Dharmabad, Hadgaon,  Himayatnagar, Kandhar, Kinwat, Loha, Mahur, Mudkhed, Mukhed, Naigaon, and Umri. In 1981, there were eight talukas in the district, viz. Nanded, Hadgaon, Kinwat, Bhokar, Biloli, Deglur (Degloor), Mukhed and Kandhar.

References

Talukas in Maharashtra
Talukas in Nanded district